Soluklu (also Romanized as Solūklū, Solook Loo, and Solū Kalū; also known as Sūlūklī) is a village in Milajerd Rural District, Milajerd District, Komijan County, Markazi Province, Iran. At the 2006 census, its population was 176, in 40 families.

References 

Populated places in Komijan County